Captain Frank Augustus Chaffey (31 March 1888 – 9 July 1940) was an Australian politician.

He was born at Moonbi to farmer William Adolphus Chaffey and Amelia, née Chad. He was educated at Nemingha and Tamworth before attending Hawkesbury Agricultural College, after which he worked on the family dairy farm. He studied at Sydney Technical College from 1907 and worked as a woolclasser briefly before returning to Tamworth to run the farm. He was active in the local Farmers and Settlers Association. On 1 May 1912 he married Amy Stella McIlveen, with whom he had six children. During World War I he served with the 1st Light Horse Brigade and from 1918 to 1919 was Director of Education of the Australian Infantry Forces.

Chaffey was elected to the New South Wales Legislative Assembly in 1913 as the Liberal member for Tamworth. When proportional representation was introduced in 1920 (by which time the Liberal Party had become the Nationalist Party), he became one of the members for Namoi, but he returned to his old seat when single-member electorates were re-introduced in 1927. He was Assistant Minister for Lands and Agriculture from April 1922 until June, when he became full Minister, serving until 1925; he later served as Secretary for Mines and Minister for Forests (1927–1929) and Colonial Secretary (1929–38).

On 9 July 1940, Chaffey died of a coronary occlusion at his Sydney home in Rose Bay, New South Wales. Premier Alexander Mair spoke after his death that "The State has lost a splendid citizen of the highest worth. As a Member of the Legislative Assembly and a former Cabinet Minister, and as a private citizen he was held in the highest esteem" and that; "His career was one of the longest in the history of the State. He showed outstanding capacity as an administrator." Chaffey was cremated at Northern Suburbs Crematorium following a private service which was held at St Michael's Church, Vaucluse. He was succeeded in Parliament as the member for Tamworth by his son, Bill.

Chaffey Dam, a large freshwater dam on the Peel River north of Tamworth, New South Wales is named after both Frank and Bill Chaffey.

References

 

1888 births
1940 deaths
Nationalist Party of Australia members of the Parliament of New South Wales
United Australia Party members of the Parliament of New South Wales
Members of the New South Wales Legislative Assembly
Australian farmers
Australian soldiers
University of Technology Sydney alumni
20th-century Australian politicians